Mumbai Metropolitan Region (abbreviated to MMR and previously also as Greater Bombay Metropolitan Area), is a metropolitan area  consisting of Mumbai (Bombay) and its satellite towns in the northern Konkan division, of the Maharashtra state in western India.

Developing over a period of about 20 years, it consists of nine municipal corporations and eight smaller municipal councils. The entire area is overseen by the Mumbai Metropolitan Region Development Authority (MMRDA), a state-owned organisation in charge of town planning, development, transportation and housing in the region.

The MMRDA was formed to address the challenges in planning and development of integrated infrastructure for the metropolitan region. The areas outside Brihanmumbai (Greater Mumbai) and Navi Mumbai have lacked organised development. Navi Mumbai, developed as one of the largest planned cities in the world, was promoted by a state government-owned company, City and Industrial Development Corporation (CIDCO).

The region has had problems related to haphazard and illegal development as a result of rapid urbanisation. Villages along the NH 3 in Bhiwandi are examples of haphazard developments in the MMR, with some of the largest warehousing areas in India. Government agencies such as the Town Planner and Collector of Thane have had challenges in addressing unorganised development.

Municipal Corporations 
 Greater Mumbai (Brihanmumbai)
 Thane
 Mira-Bhayandar
 Kalyan-Dombivli
 Ulhasnagar
 Bhiwandi-Nizampur 
 Navi Mumbai
 Panvel
 Vasai-Virar

Municipal councils 
 Ambernath
 Badlapur
 Uran
 Alibag
 Pen
 Matheran
 Karjat
 Khopoli
 Palghar

Districts 
Mumbai City (complete)
Mumbai Suburban (complete)
Thane (partial)
Palghar (partial)
Raigad (partial)

See also
 Chennai metropolitan area
 Kolkata metropolitan area
 List of metropolitan areas in India
 National Capital Region (India)

References

External links
 MMRDA cities table
Mumbai Railway Station Names
 Mumbai Metropolitan Region Development Authority - Who We Are

Geography of Mumbai
Mumbai